Miloslav Švaříček (born 14 February 1942) is a Czech former skier. He competed in the Nordic combined event at the 1964 Winter Olympics.

References

External links
 

1942 births
Living people
Czech male Nordic combined skiers
Olympic Nordic combined skiers of Czechoslovakia
Nordic combined skiers at the 1964 Winter Olympics
People from Nové Město na Moravě
Sportspeople from the Vysočina Region